Kings Mine is an unincorporated community and coal town in southwestern Center Township, Guernsey County, Ohio, United States. It was also called Guild.

References

Unincorporated communities in Guernsey County, Ohio
Coal towns in Ohio
Unincorporated communities in Ohio